Edi is a given name.  Notable people with the given name include:

 Edi Angelillo (born 1961), Italian actress
 Edi Buro (born 1987), Bosnian-American soccer player
 Edi Çajku (born 1982), Albanian footballer
 Edi Dadić (born 1993), Croatian cross country skier
 Edi Danilo Guerra (born 1987), Guatemalan footballer
 Edi Gathegi (born 1979), American actor
 Edi Federer (1955–2012), Austrian ski jumper
 Edi Fitzroy (1955–2017), Jamaican reggae singer
 Edi Hafid (born 1983), Indonesian footballer
 Edi Heiz (born 1947), Swiss canoeist
 Edi Kurnia (born 1983), Indonesian footballer
 Edi Kurniawan (born 1988), Indonesian weightlifter
 Edi Maia (born 1987), Portuguese pole vaulter
 Edi Mall (1924–2014), Austrian alpine skier
 Edi Martini (born 1975), Albanian football manager and player
 Edi Orioli (born 1962), Italian motorcycle racer
 Edi Paloka (born 1965), Albanian politician
 Edi Patterson, American actress
 Edi Ponoš (born 1976), Croatian javelin thrower
 Edi Rama (born 1964), Albanian politician
 Edi Schild (born 1919), Swiss cross-country skier
 Edi Scholdan (–1961), Austrian figure skater
 Edi Sinadinović (born 1988), Serbian basketball player
 Edi Stecher, Austrian Righteous Among the Nations
 Edi Stöhr (born 1956), German football manager and player
 Edi Subaktiar (born 1994), Indonesian badminton player
 Edi Ziegler (born 1930), German road racing cyclist